Clepsis aliana is a species of moth of the family Tortricidae. It is found on Hokkaido island in Japan.

The wingspan is 21–23 mm.

References

Moths described in 1965
Clepsis